Physalaemus albifrons is a species of frog in the family Leptodactylidae.
It is endemic to Brazil.
Its natural habitats are subtropical or tropical moist lowland forests, dry savanna, moist savanna, subtropical or tropical dry shrubland, subtropical or tropical moist shrubland, and intermittent freshwater marshes.
It is threatened by habitat loss.

References 

Albifrons
Endemic fauna of Brazil
Taxonomy articles created by Polbot
Amphibians described in 1824